Kosmos 801 ( meaning Cosmos 801), also known as DS-P1-I No.16 was a satellite which was used as a radar target for anti-ballistic missile tests. It was launched by the Soviet Union in 1976 as part of the Dnepropetrovsk Sputnik programme.

It was launched aboard a Kosmos-2I 63SM rocket, from Site 133/1 at Plesetsk. The launch occurred at 14:39 UTC on 5 February 1976.

It decayed from orbit on 5 January 1978.

Kosmos 801 was the sixteenth of nineteen DS-P1-I satellites to be launched. Of these, all reached orbit successfully except the seventh.

See also

1976 in spaceflight

References

1976 in spaceflight
Kosmos satellites
Spacecraft launched in 1976
Dnepropetrovsk Sputnik program